A canonarch is a lead cantor, or reader, in Eastern Christian churches of the Byzantine tradition. The canonarch ensures that other readers chant from the correct texts and use the proper tones. The canonarch  preserves the canonical order in the liturgical services through proper use of the Typicon. 

The canonarch also reads the verses of the prokeimenon and related texts. In some churches many of the duties of the canonarch are assumed by deacon, such as chanting the verses of Theos Kyrios.

References
 Parry, Ken et al., editors. The Blackwell Dictionary of Eastern Christianity. Malden, MA: Blackwell Publishing, 2001, p. 111. 
 Simmons, Nikita. Troparia, Sessional Hymns and Kontakia in the East-Slavic Singing Traditions. Synaxis.info, retrieved June 2007.
 Hieromonk Cassian. The responsibilities of the canonarch. Orthodox Christian Information Center online, retrieved June 2007. 

Ecclesiastical titles
Byzantine Rite